Sex Sent Me to the ER is an American reality television series aired on TLC that premiered on December 28, 2013. The show features actors who reenact various real-life accidents that occurred during sex. A preview reported on by The New York Post included segments on a 440-pound man who put his 110-pound girlfriend's head through a wall, and a man who broke his penis while having sex with his wife and his girlfriend (who subsequently fought in the emergency room).

Episode guide

Season 1 

 1 x 1	It Was A Doozy 2013-12-28.
 1 x 2	It Won't Stop! 2014-01-04.	
 1 x 3	Hot in Vegas 2014-01-11.
 1 x 4	Valentine's Surprise 2014-01-24.
 1 x 5	Sticky Situation 2014-04-12.
 1 x 6	Get a Room 2014-04-19.
 1 x 7	Natural Disaster 2014-04-26.
 1 x 8	Clean Up On Aisle 4 2014-05-02.
 1 x 9	Get Your Rocks Off 2014-05-09.
 1 x 10 Bedroom Slip-up 2014-05-17.
 1 x 11 Game Over 2014-05-24.
 1 x 12 Man In Steel 2014-05-31.
 1 x 13 Hot Air Affair 2014-06-07.	
 1 x 14 Drama Down Under 2014-06-14.
 1 x 15 Give a Dog a Bone 2014-06-21	
 1 x 16 Forbidden Fruit 2014-06-28.
 1 x 17 Motorcycle Mayhem 2014-07-05.
 1 x 18 Birthday Surprise! 2014-07-12.
 1 x 19 Stuck on Me 2014-07-19.
 1 x 20 The Skydive Club 2014-10-25.
 1 x 21 Have a Ball 2014-11-01.
 1 x 22 Pole Position	2014-11-08.
 1 x 23 Rock n' Romp 2014-11-15.
 1 x 24 Body Building Blunder 2014-11-22	
 1 x 25 Busted! 2014-11-29.
 1 x 26 Wax On, Wax Off 2014-12-06.
 1 x 27 Retirement Hobby 2014-12-06.
 1 x 28 Holiday Hanky-Panky 2014-12-13.
 1 x 29 Can't Get Up 2014-12-20.
 1 x 30 Study Buddies 2014-12-27.
 1 x 31 The Buck Stops Here 2015-01-03.
 1 x 32 Mile High Mishap 2015-01-10.
 1 x 33 Cut It Off! 2015-01-10.
 1 x 34 Mardi Gras Mischief 2015-01-17.
 1 x 35 Scorching Secret! 2015-01-24.
 1 x 36 Mime Your Business 2015-01-31.
 1 x 37 Lock and Key 2015-02-07.
 1 x 38 Old Flame Shame 2015-02-14.
 1 x 39 5 Times & No Fun 2015-02-28.

Season 2 

 2 x 1	Zambonie Apocalypse 2016-01-02	
 2 x 2	Three's a Crowd	2016-01-09	
 2 x 3	Pump and Go 2016-01-16	
 2 x 4	Hitting The Hay	2016-01-23	
 2 x 5	One Wild Ride 2016-01-30	
 2 x 6	Handy Man 2016-02-06	
 2 x 7	Top 10 Mishaps 2016-02-13	
 2 x 8	Dirty Laundry 2016-02-20	
 2 x 9	Motivated Patient 2016-02-27
 2 x 10 Prison Problems 2016-03-05	
 2 x 11 Mannequin Mischief 2016-03-12	
 2 x 12 Bedroom Eyes 2016-03-19	
 2 x 13 Super Secrets 2016-03-19	
 2 x 14 Routine Romance 2016-03-26	
 2 x 15 Top 10 Moments in the Wild 2016-03-26

References

External links 
 
 

2010s American reality television series
2013 American television series debuts
2016 American television series endings
TLC (TV network) original programming
Erotic television series
English-language television shows